Auneuil is a commune in the Oise department in northern France. On 1 January 2017, the former commune of Troussures was merged into Auneuil.

Population

See also
 Communes of the Oise department

References

Communes of Oise

Communes nouvelles of Oise